Edward Alexander Newell Arber (5 August 1870, London – 14 June 1918, Cambridge) was an English  botanist and paleontologist.
 
He was a professor at the University of Cambridge specialising in palaeobotany.

He married plant morphologist and philosopher Agnes Robertson in 1909. They had many interests in common, and his marriage was described as 'happy'. They had one child, a daughter. He died in 1918 following a period of ill health.

Works
Partial list
 1905. Catalogue of the fossil plants of the Glossopteris flora in the department of geology, British Museum (natural history): being a monograph of the permo-carboniferous flora of India and the southern hemisphere. Ed. Longmans. 255 pp.
 1910. Plant life in Alpine Switzerland: being an account in simple language of the natural history of Alpine plants. Ed. J. Murray. 355 pp.
 1911. The Natural History of Coal. Ed. University Press. 163 pp. Reeditó en 2008 Kessinger Publ. 176 pp. 
 1911. The coast scenery of North Devon: being an account of the geological features of the coast-line extending from Porlock in Somerset to Boscastle in North Cornwall, Ed. J.M. Dent & Sons, Ltd. 261 pp.
 1917. The earlier mesozoic Floras of New Zealand. Volumen 6 de New Zealand. Dep. of Mines. New Zealand Geol. Survey. Palaeontological Bulletin. 80 pp.
 1921. Devonian Floras; a study of the origin of Cormophyta. 100 pp. Reprinted in 2010 General Books LLC. 62 pp.

References

External links 

 
 National Portrait Gallery Pencil and watercolour by Denis Gascoigne Lillie, probably 1905.

English botanists
English palaeontologists
1918 deaths
1870 births
Scientists from London
Academics of the University of Cambridge
Paleobotanists